EXPAND-TB (Expanding Access to New Diagnostics for TB) is a UNITAID-funded project launched in 2009, which aims to increase access to tuberculosis (TB) diagnostic tests in 27 endemic countries.

The overall goal of the project is to narrow the huge diagnostic gap in multi-drug-resistant tuberculosis (MDR-TB) control by expanding and accelerating access to new and rapid diagnostic technologies within appropriate laboratory services, accompanied by the necessary technology transfer, and ensuring these new technologies are properly integrated within TB control programmes.

Main Partners

 UNITAID
 World Health Organization (WHO)
 Foundation for Innovative New Diagnostics
 Stop TB Partnership Global Laboratory Initiative (GLI)
 Stop TB Partnership Global Drug Facility (GDF)

References

Organizations established in 2009
Tuberculosis